Dash Point is an unincorporated community in Pierce County, Washington, United States.  Because it is not incorporated, no census population figures are available. Dash Point is a residential area surrounded by Puget Sound to the north, Dash Point State Park to the east, and the city of Tacoma to the south and west. Dash Point is located across Commencement Bay from downtown Tacoma.

Dash Point relies entirely on Tacoma for city services, and lacks a town center of its own. Although Dash Point is located in Pierce County, Dash Point State Park is located in neighboring King County.

History 
Prior to being known as Dash Point the area was known as lson Landing, Fairview Beach, and Woodstock Beach. The origin of the name Dash Point is unclear. The area was named Dash Point on official maps by 1877.

The land was sold by the McLeod family to the State of Washington in the late 1940s for use as a park. The park was dedicated and developed in 1962 for the Seattle World's Fair.

Education
The area is served by Tacoma Public Schools, a public school district. It is zoned to Browns Point Elementary School, Meeker Middle School, and Stadium High School.

References

Unincorporated communities in Pierce County, Washington
Unincorporated communities in Washington (state)